The 2013 Tennessee Tech Golden Eagles football team represented Tennessee Technological University as a member of Ohio Valley Conference (OVC) during the 2013 NCAA Division I FCS football season. Led by seventh-year head coach Watson Brown, the Golden Eagles compiled an overall record of 5–7 overall with a mark of 2–6 in conference play, tying for seventh place in the OVC. Tennessee Tech played home games at Tucker Stadium in Cookeville, Tennessee.

Schedule

References

Tennessee Tech
Tennessee Tech Golden Eagles football seasons
Tennessee Tech Golden Eagles football